The Isla Iguana Wildlife Refuge is a 58-hectare wildlife reserve located 5 kilometers off the Los Santos Province on the Azuero Peninsula in Panama.

History

During World War II, the United States Army used the Isla Iguana Wildlife Refuge as a bombing range. To clear the area, two thousand-pound bombs stuck in the surrounding coral reef were detonated in the 1990s.

In the 1960s, a settler on the northern part of the island claimed it as his property and planted exotic plants such as mango and guava trees, corn and sugar cane. These non-native plants still inhabit the island to this day. Late in the decade, the man was removed by the government.

The Isla Iguana Wildlife Refuge was declared protected on June 15, 1981.

Wildlife

Native animals include crabs (among them hermit crabs), black and green iguanas, boa constrictors, and red throated frigates. It is a vital nesting ground for several species of frigate as well as sea turtles.

See also
List of lighthouses in Panama

References

External links
 Panama News article

Geography of Panama
Pacific islands of Panama
Protected areas of Panama
Nature reserves
Los Santos Province
Lighthouses in Panama
Protected areas established in 1981